Gakuo is a sir name in central part of Kenya. Notable people who have this name are John Gakuo who was the former town clerk of Nairobi, Margaret Gakuo who is the current First Lady of Kenya and the wife of president Uhuru Kenyatta, Rose Gakuo who  is the head of public relations and stake holder engagement at the Nairobi Metropolitan Services (NMS), in the office of the president among other notable people who have the name.

References 

Populated places in Central Province (Kenya)